Clusia skotaster is a species of flowering plant in the family Clusiaceae. It is found only in Ecuador. Its natural habitat is subtropical or tropical moist montane forest.

References

skotaster
Endemic flora of Ecuador
Vulnerable plants
Taxonomy articles created by Polbot